The following is a list of characters from the novel Sword Stained with Royal Blood by Jin Yong (Louis Cha). Eight of these characters also appear or are mentioned by name in The Deer and the Cauldron, another of Jin Yong's works.

Main characters 
 Yuan Chengzhi is the protagonist and Yuan Chonghuan's son. Originally trained in martial arts by Mu Renqing, he later inherits the skills of Xia Xueyi by chance. One of the most powerful swordsmen of his age, he strives to uphold justice and defend the Han Chinese nation from internal and external threats. At the end of the novel, he leaves China for good and sails to a distant land with his companions.
 Xia Xueyi, nicknamed "Golden Serpent Gentleman", was a powerful swordsman with extraordinary skills, charming good looks and a chivalrous personality. He was involved in two separate romantic relationships with He Hongyao and Wen Yi. As he is already long dead before the events of the novel take place, he is only mentioned by name throughout the novel.
 Xia Qingqing, also known as Wen Qingqing, is the daughter of Xia Xueyi and Wen Yi. She is first introduced as a member of the Wen family, a clan of brigands. After getting into conflict with the Wen elders, she leaves the Wen family and follows Yuan Chengzhi in pursuit of a new life.
 Ajiu is actually Princess Changping, the second and favourite daughter of the Chongzhen Emperor. She is introduced as a beautiful and elegant young lady who frequently hangs out with martial artists in the jianghu. She meets Yuan Chengzhi and they develop a romantic relationship, much to Xia Qingqing's jealousy and hostility. When Li Zicheng's rebels overrun the Forbidden City, her despaired father attacks her with a sword and cuts off her left arm in a desperate attempt to spare her from any humiliation if she were to be captured by the rebels. Fortunately, Yuan Chengzhi appears in time and saves her and she survives. At the end of the novel, she feels disillusioned with the world and decides to detach herself from worldly attachments, so she becomes a Buddhist nun and renames herself Jiunan. She also appears in The Deer and the Cauldron, another of Jin Yong's novels.
 He Tieshou is the leader of the Five Poisons Cult who has a hook for her right hand, as her name Tieshou (literally "iron hand") suggests. She is recruited by Prince Hui to assist him in seizing the throne from the Chongzhen Emperor. During this time, she meets Yuan Chengzhi and his friends, and plays evil pranks on them to hinder their missions. She has a crush on Xia Qingqing, who is disguised as a young male scholar, and decides to betray her cult and break ties with Prince Hui. Yuan Chengzhi succeeds in reforming her, accepts her as an apprentice, and renames her He Tishou; Tishou means "vigilance and safeguard". She is mentioned by name in The Deer and the Cauldron.

Yuan Chengzhi's allies 
 Jiao Wan'er is Jiao Gongli's daughter. She seeks vengeance on Min Zihua after mistakenly thinking that he murdered her father. With Yuan Chengzhi's help, she discovers that the Taibai Sanying are the ones responsible and kills them in revenge. She marries Luo Liru.
 Luo Liru is one of Jiao Gongli's apprentices. Sun Zhongjun sliced off his right arm in a heated misunderstanding. Yuan Chengzhi helps him overcome his disability by teaching him a set of left-handed saber movements.
 Hong Shenghai is a member of the Bohai School. He has gotten into a serious misunderstanding with Gui Xinshu and Gui Erniang, who have been trying to hunt him down and kill him. He meets Yuan Chengzhi and decides to follow him for protection. Yuan helps him resolve his conflict with the Gui couple.
 Cheng Qingzhu is the chief of the Green Bamboo Gang and the martial arts master of Ajiu.
 Sha Tianguang is the leader of a group of bandits who attempt to rob Yuan Chengzhi and his friends of their treasure. When they are ambushed by Ming soldiers while scuffling for the treasure, Yuan sides with them and fights alongside them against the soldiers. Sha Tongtian is so impressed with Yuan that he pledges allegiance to him.
 Hu Guinan, nicknamed "Divine Thief", is a martial artist highly skilled in the art of thieving.
 Yisheng is a Buddhist monk nicknamed "Iron Arhat".
 Shui Jian is a military officer in charge of escorting some prisoners. He and his men are attacked and defeated by Yuan Chengzhi and his followers. After he is captured, he pledges allegiance to Yuan, who spares his life. He helps Yuan organise his followers to form a militia and train them in warfare.

Rebels 
 Li Zicheng, nicknamed "Dashing King", is the leader of the rebel forces which overthrow the corrupt Ming government. After his victory, he not only fails to deliver his promises to restore peace and stability, but also condones his followers' brutality towards the common people. The short-lived interim government he set up to replace the Ming dynasty is eventually defeated by the Manchus, who establish the Qing Empire to replace the Ming Empire. He appears again in The Deer and the Cauldron.
 Li Yan is a trusted adviser of Li Zicheng and a general of the rebel army who befriends Yuan Chengzhi. A righteous individual, Li Yan tries to stop the moral corruption of the rebels but fails. Li Zicheng ultimately believes slanderous rumours that Li Yan is plotting against him and forces him to commit suicide..
 The Red Maiden is Li Yan's wife who is famous for her bravery and selfless acts. She commits suicide with her husband. Their son, Li Xihua, appears in The Deer and the Cauldron in which he attempts to kill Li Zicheng to avenge his parents.
 An Daniang is An Jianqing's wife who briefly took care of Yuan Chengzhi when he was still a child. She serves the rebels as a spy.
 An Xiaohui is An Jianqing and An Daniang's daughter and a childhood friend of Yuan Chengzhi. Like her mother, she works as a spy for the rebels. Yuan Chengzhi helps her recover the lost gold from the Wen family. She marries Cui Ximin.
 Shanzong is an organisation formed by Yuan Chonghuan's former subordinates. They took care of Yuan Chengzhi after his father's death and sent him to the Mount Hua School. Although they initially planned to write a petition to the Chongzhen Emperor to seek redress for Yuan Chonghuan, they ultimately decided to join Li Zicheng's rebel army after seeing that the Ming government is too corrupt to be saved. Its members include:
 Ying Song
 Luo Daqian
 Zhu Anguo
 Sun Zhongshou
 Tian Jianxiu
 Cui Qiushan

Mount Hua School and associates 

 Mu Renqing, nicknamed "Divine Sword, Immortal Ape", is the leader of the Mount Hua School and Yuan Chengzhi's martial arts master. His prowess in martial arts and swordplay is legendary.
 Huang Zhen, nicknamed "Copper Brush and Iron Abacus", is Mu Renqing's first apprentice.
 Huang Zhen's apprentices:
 Feng Nandi becomes the leader of the Mount Hua School in The Deer and the Cauldron.
 Cui Ximin
 Gui Xinshu, nicknamed "Invincible Divine Fists", is Mu Renqing's second apprentice. He and his wife, Gui Erniang, are extremely protective of their infant son, who is born in poor health. The three of them appear in The Deer and the Cauldron; their son, Gui Zhong, has grown up to become a young adult.
 Gui Xinshu's apprentices:
 Mei Jianhe
 Liu Peisheng
 Sun Zhongjun
 Taoist Musang is the leader of the Iron Sword School and a close friend of Mu Renqing who has also instructed Yuan Chengzhi in martial arts before. He is obsessed with weiqi and willing to spend an entire day playing with someone. At the end of the novel, he takes in Ajiu as his apprentice.
 Yuzhenzi is Musang's junior. Tempted by wealth and fame, he decides to betray his school and serve the Manchus. He aids the Manchus in sabotaging the Ming forces. Yuan Chengzhi runs into trouble with him on several different occasions. He is eventually slain by the combined efforts of Yuan, Ajiu, Sun Zhongjun and He Tishou.

Manchu forces 
 Nurhaci, who is mentioned by name only, was the chief of the Manchu tribes. He led his forces to attack the Ming Empire and was mortally wounded during the Battle of Ningyuan.
 Huangtaiji is Nurhaci's son and successor who has become the emperor of the Manchus. A shrewd military leader, he tricked the Chongzhen Emperor into believing that Yuan Chonghuan was a traitor, causing the emperor to order Yuan's execution. Yuan Chengzhi attempts to assassinate him in Mukden but fails. Later, he is assassinated by his half-brother, Dorgon.
 Dorgon is Huangtaiji's younger half-brother and a charismatic general. He has an affair with Huangtaiji's concubine and commits fratricide/regicide when his brother becomes suspicious of him.

Ming forces 
 Yuan Chonghuan was Yuan Chengzhi's father who is only mentioned by name in the novel. Formerly a general tasked with defending the Ming Empire's northern border from the Manchu invaders, he was wrongly accused of treason and put to death by the Chongzhen Emperor.
 The Chongzhen Emperor is the last ruler of the Ming dynasty. He mistakenly believed that Yuan Chonghuan was plotting to overthrow him, and ordered his execution. When the Forbidden City is overrun by Li Zicheng's rebels, he refuses to surrender or flee, and attempts to kill his family to prevent them from being taken captive. While trying to kill Ajiu, he slices off her left arm with a sword. With assistance from a loyal eunuch, he eventually commits suicide by hanging himself from a tree.
 An Jianqing is An Daniang's husband and An Xiaohui's father. Tempted by wealth and greed, he decides to serve the Ming government and becomes a secret police commander. His wife leaves him in anger and joins the rebels. They have remained on opposing sides before they eventually reconcile after he is mortally wounded while protecting the Chongzhen Emperor from Prince Hui and his followers.
 Prince Hui is a noble who attempts to usurp the throne when Li Zicheng's rebel army closes in on the capital. He hires various martial artists in the jianghu to help him overthrow the Chongzhen Emperor.
 Wu Sangui is a Ming general in charge of guarding Shanhai Pass on the northeastern border. His concubine, Chen Yuanyuan, is seized by Li Zicheng when the rebels occupy the capital. In anger, Wu defects to the Manchus and opens Shanhai Pass for the Manchus to enter and help him defeat Li Zicheng. He appears again as a minor antagonist in The Deer and the Cauldron.
 Chen Yuanyuan is Wu Sangui's concubine and is regarded as the most beautiful woman in the Ming Empire at the time. Li Zicheng seizes her as a trophy after occupying Beijing, causing Wu Sangui to defect to the Manchus. She appears again in The Deer and the Cauldron as the mother of Ake, one of Wei Xiaobao's seven wives.
 Shi Bingguang, Shi Bingwen and Li Gang, collectively known as the "Taibai Sanying", are three treacherous swordsmen who serve as spies for the Manchus. They murder Jiao Gongli and attempt to push the blame to Min Zihua before they are eventually slain by Jiao Wan'er after she uncovers the truth behind her father's death.

Five Poisons Cult 
The Five Poisons Cult is a cult and martial arts school founded by a group of Miao people. They specialise in using poisons and venoms against their enemies; the "Five Poisons" refers to the five sacred venomous species (snake, scorpion, toad, centipede and spider) in their school. They are led by He Tieshou, who is recruited by Prince Hui to help him overthrow the Chongzhen Emperor and seize the throne.

 He Hongyao is He Tieshou's aunt and one of the cult's elders. She has a past romantic affair with Xia Xueyi and seeks vengeance on him after he betrays her love. When she learns that Xia Qingqing is Xia Xueyi's daughter, she directs her anger towards Xia Qingqing and attempts to harm her. She is killed in a toxic explosion in the cave where Xia Xueyi is buried.
 Qi Yun'ao is an elder of the cult who specialises in using snake venom and often disguises himself as a beggar. He is killed by He Hongyao during the cult's internal conflict.

Wen family 
 Wen Fangda, Wen Fangyi, Wen Fangshan, Wen Fangshi and Wen Fangwu, collectively known as the Five Wen Elders, are the five patriarchs of the Wen family who lead a group of brigands. Previously notorious bandits with a hideous history, they had a blood feud with Xia Xueyi because they had murdered his family. Their battle formation, known as the Five Elements Formation, proves a challenge to Yuan Chengzhi.
 Wen Yi is Wen Fangshan's daughter and Xia Qingqing's mother. She fell in love with Xia Xueyi even though he had a history of bad blood with her family. Her father and uncles used her as bait to lure Xia Xueyi into a trap and crippled him, but she aided him in escaping. Her family treats her and her daughter coldly after Xia Xueyi's disappearance.

Others 
 Min Zihua is a member of the Xiandu School. He was misled into believing that Jiao Gongli killed his brother, so he rallied a group of martial artists to join him in confronting Jiao Gongli. Yuan Chengzhi helps to defuse the conflict and clear Jiao's name. As part of an earlier agreement, Min Zihua hands over his villa to Yuan Chengzhi and promises never to bother Jiao Gongli again.
 Jiao Gongli is the chief of the Golden Dragon Gang who is murdered by the "Taibai Sanying", who attempt to push the blame to his former rival, Min Zihua.
 Meng Bofei is a reputable elderly martial artist who is nominated to lead a group of martial artists gathered on Mount Tai. He loses the position to Yuan Chengzhi.
 Zhang Chaotang, Yang Pengju and Zhang Kang are three ethnic Chinese officials from the Bruneian Empire who visit China.
 Raymond, Peter and Rooklyn are three Europeans overseeing the sale of a battery of cannons to the Ming imperial army. They present Yuan Chengzhi with a map of the Far East after losing to him in a duel.
 Zhang Chunjiu, who is mentioned by name only, was a martial artist who sought the whereabouts of Xia Xueyi. He was killed by Xia Xueyi after finding the Golden Serpent Manual on Mount Hua.

See also 
 List of organisations in wuxia fiction

Lists of Jin Yong characters
Sword Stained with Royal Blood
Fictional Ming dynasty people